David Morris (1800 – 30 September 1864) was a British Whig and Liberal politician, and banker.

Early life
The eldest son of banker William Morris, he spent his early life working in the family firm, Morris and Sons of Carmarthen. He retired from the firm at a young age having amassed a substantial personal fortune.

Parliamentary career
Morris was elected Whig MP for Carmarthen Boroughs at the 1837 general election. Morris defeated the former member, W.H. Yelverton of Whitland Abbey, who had held the seat from 1832 until 1835.

Although Morris held broadly Liberal views his political opinions were subordinated by his belief that his first duty was to represent his constituents, and in this regard he was a diligent member of the Commons who was rarely absent from divisions.

Having been elected in 1837 he never again faced a contested election. He was re-elected unopposed in 1841. On this occasion he declared in his speech accepting the nomination for a further term that he had sought to represent the sentiments of the electors by voting for reductions in the civil list payments to the royal family, in favour of abolishing flogging in the army, the total abolition of slavery and the mitigation of the most drastic impacts of the Poor Law legislation.

In 1847, Morris returned to Carmarthen at the start of the election campaign and was welcomed with festivities and celebrations. He was again returned unopposed. At the next election in 1852, Morris was again returned by acclamation.

As reported in 1857, opposition was regarded as being "perfectly useless" due to his popularity in the boroughs. Morris attracted support from a wide range of groups within the constituency including nonconformists. However, when a toast to dissenting ministers was offered at a dinner celebrating his return in 1857 no dissenting minister was present to acknowledge it. During his later years, Morris moved closer to supporting the radical wing of the Liberal Party, including the extension of the franchise, introducing the secret ballot and the abolition of church rates.

In 1859 a portrait of Morris was presented to the Carmarthen Corporation. By the end of his career he was considered a Liberal from 1859, and held the seat until his death in 1864.

In 1860, following the death of the first Earl Cawdor, Morris it was immediately speculated that he was as a potential candidate for Lord Lieutenant of Carmarthenshire. However, Lord Emlyn, who succeeded his father as Earl of Cawdor also inherited the lord lieutenancy.

Outside of Parliament, Morris was also a Justice of the Peace for Carmarthenshire.

Death and legacy
On 20 September 1864, Morris attended a ceremony at Llanelli to lay the foundation stone for a new Market Hall and the following day attended a meeting of the Carmarthenshire Agricultural Society. He retired as usual that evening but by morning was found to be seriously ill. Within a few days, he was dead.

Upon his death, supporters and opponents alike praised his diligence as a member. His funeral at Carmarthen was reported to be the largest since the death of John Jones of Ystrad, a former MP for Carmarthenshire, in the 1840s. A procession consisting of around eight hundred people accompanied the hearse from Morris's residence in King Street to the public cemetery.

David Morris bequeathed substantial sums to charities, including £2000 to the poor of Carmarthen, £1000 to the poor of Llanelli and £500 to Carmarthen Infirmary. A David Morris Charity operated until the 1990s. The rest of his substantial fortune, said to amount to £250,000, was divided between his cousins, Thomas Charles Morris of Bryn Myrddyn and William Morris of Cwm.  William Morris succeeded him as MP for Carmarthen Boroughs.

References

External links
 

UK MPs 1837–1841
UK MPs 1841–1847
UK MPs 1847–1852
UK MPs 1852–1857
UK MPs 1857–1859
UK MPs 1859–1865
1800 births
1864 deaths
Whig (British political party) MPs for Welsh constituencies
Liberal Party (UK) MPs for Welsh constituencies
Welsh justices of the peace